Drama Special Series is a weekly program on KBS2 showing multiple episodes short dramas, with each story having a different cast, director, and writer. The format is based on Drama Special.

Drama Special Series

Season 1

Season 2

Season 3

See also
Drama City
KBS Drama Special

References

External links
 Official website KBS Drama Special Series Season 1 
 Official website KBS Drama Special Series Season 2 
 Official website KBS Drama Special Series Season 3 

Korean Broadcasting System television dramas
Korean-language television shows